The list of ship decommissionings in 1920 includes a chronological list of all ships decommissioned in 1920.


See also 

1920
 Ship decommissionings
Ship